Erick Weeks Lewis (born 10 March 1986) is a Liberian footballer who is an attacking midfielder for Persib Bandung.

Honours

Club honours
Mighty Barrolle
Liberian Premier League (1): 2006

Cotonsport Garoua 		
Elite One (1): 2007
Cameroonian Cup (1): 2007

External links
Player profile - www.cotonsport.com

1986 births
Living people
Liberian footballers
Liberia international footballers
Coton Sport FC de Garoua players
Expatriate footballers in Indonesia
Expatriate footballers in Cameroon
Liga 1 (Indonesia) players
Persiwa Wamena players
Sriwijaya F.C. players
Mitra Kukar players
Borneo F.C. players
Liberian expatriate sportspeople in Indonesia
Perak F.C. players
Expatriate footballers in Equatorial Guinea
Liberian expatriate footballers
Association football midfielders
Barrack Young Controllers FC players